The 25th Vanier Cup was played on November 18, 1989, at the SkyDome in Toronto, Ontario, and decided the CIAU football champion for the 1989 season. The Western Mustangs won their fifth championship by defeating the Saskatchewan Huskies by a score of 35-10. This was the first Vanier Cup game to be played in the SkyDome and set a Vanier Cup attendance record which stood until 2012.

References

External links
 Official website

Vanier Cup
Vanier Cup
1989 in Toronto
November 1989 sports events in Canada